This is a timeline of LGBT Mormon history in the 2020s, part of a series of timelines consisting of events, publications, and speeches about LGBTQ+ individuals, topics around sexual orientation and gender minorities, and the community of members of the Church of Jesus Christ of Latter-day Saints (LDS Church).

Timeline

2020
 February – The church released the new version of its leadership handbook, General Handbook: Serving in The Church of Jesus Christ of Latter-day Saints. It defines gender as "biological sex at birth" and states that any kind of gender transition—whether that includes a change of name or pronouns, "elective medical or surgical intervention," or even gendered dress—will bring about "Church membership restrictions" until the person ceases their gender transition. Transgender people may enter temples and attend meetings, but certain restrictions will apply, such as the ineligibility of transgender men for the priesthood. At the same time, the handbook reflected the previously announced policy regarding children of same-sex couples, now allowing these children to be blessed and baptized without limitations that previously existed.
February – BYU released an updated honor code intended to align with the church's new handbook. The previous honor code specifically noted prohibiting hand-holding and kissing between same-sex couples. The updated honor code does not contain the section about "homosexual behavior." The school, however, clarified that "Even though we have removed the more prescriptive language, the principles of the Honor Code remain the same."
July – Same-Sex Attracted, a documentary by queer BYU students about queer BYU students, debuted at the Salt Lake City LGBTQ film festival.

2021
 June – Singer and American Idol alumnus David Archuleta comes out as a member of the LGBT Community. In his coming out post, Archuleta urged people of faith to "be more understanding and compassionate to those who are LGBTQIA+." Archuleta's coming out brought more attention to the Church's ban on same-sex marriage and relationships.
 August – Latter-day Saint Apostle and former Brigham Young University President Jeffrey R. Holland spoke at BYU's 2021 University Conference, encouraging BYU to use its platform to more aggressively defend the Church's positions, especially its position against same-sex marriage. Holland also indirectly targeted 2019 BYU valedictorian Matt Easton for coming out during his convocation speech, saying "If a student commandeers a graduation podium intended to represent everyone getting diplomas in order to announce his personal sexual orientation, what might another speaker feel free to announce the next year until eventually anything goes?" Holland continued by accusing Easton of "divisiveness." According to Easton's response to Holland's speech in the Salt Lake Tribune, Easton's valedictorian address was pre-approved by the University.
December – Businessman Jeff Green publicly announced he was leaving the LDS Church and donating $600,000 to the LGBT rights organization Equality Utah. Writing to Russell Nelson, president of the Church, he said: "I believe the Mormon church has hindered global progress in women's rights, civil rights and racial equality, and LGBTQ+ rights."

2022
 March – The Student Association Senate at Rice University voted unanimously to sever athletic ties with Brigham Young University over their mistreatment of LGBT students and faculty.

See also

 Homosexuality and the LDS Church
 Law of adoption (Mormonism)
 LGBT rights and the LDS Church
 LGBT rights in Utah
 LGBT Mormon suicides
 List of Christian denominational positions on homosexuality
 Mormonism in the 21st century
 Sexuality and Mormonism
 Utah Constitutional Amendment 3

References

LGBT and Mormonism
LGBT history in the United States
Timelines of Christianity
History of the Latter Day Saint movement
 
21st century in LGBT history
LGBT Mormon